The Baum Circle refers to the group of artists either taught by, associated with, or directly influenced by Pennsylvania impressionist painter Walter Emerson Baum.  Most of these individuals lived, worked and painted in the Lehigh Valley region of eastern Pennsylvania, particularly in Lehigh and Northampton counties, and many studied under Baum, or taught, at the Baum School of Art in Allentown.  In October 2006, the David E. Rodale Gallery at the Baum School of Art held an exhibition celebrating the work of this group.

Artists typically associated with the Baum Circle include:

External links 
 The Baum School of Art

American artist groups and collectives
Cultural history of the United States
20th-century American painters
American Impressionist painters
Artists from Allentown, Pennsylvania